U.K. were  a British progressive rock supergroup originally active from 1977 to 1980. The band was founded by bass guitarist John Wetton and drummer Bill Bruford, formerly the rhythm section of King Crimson. The band was rounded out by violinist/keyboardist Eddie Jobson, and guitarist Allan Holdsworth. Bruford and Holdsworth left in 1978, and Bruford was replaced by drummer Terry Bozzio. Jobson, Wetton and Bozzio reformed U.K. for a world tour in 2012.

History

Formation and first album
John Wetton (formerly of  Family,  Uriah Heep and Roxy Music) and Bill Bruford (formerly of  Yes) had worked together in King Crimson from 1972 to 1974, when guitarist Robert Fripp disbanded the group. In July 1976, Bruford assisted Wetton on demos originally proposed for a Wetton solo album (two of these demos were later released on the compilation Monkey Business in 1998). In September 1976, they formed a band with keyboardist Rick Wakeman, who had previously worked with Bruford in Yes. The project was stopped after rehearsals by Wakeman's label. According to Bruford, "A&M Records were unwilling to let their 'star', Wakeman, walk off with a used, slightly soiled King Crimson rhythm section, and the idea failed".

Bruford and Wetton next approached Robert Fripp to reform King Crimson. When Fripp eventually declined, Bruford and Wetton decided that each would choose a musician in order to form a new band. Wetton brought in Eddie Jobson (formerly of Curved Air, Roxy Music and Frank Zappa’s band), whom he had met during his brief time as touring bassist with Roxy Music, thus "stealing" him from Zappa. Bruford recruited Allan Holdsworth (formerly of Soft Machine, Gong,  Tempest and The Tony Williams Lifetime) who had played on Bruford's debut solo album, Feels Good to Me (1978).

The band's formation coincided with the introduction of the Yamaha CS-80 synthesizer, and this instrument became an integral part of their developing sound.

U.K. released their self-titled debut album in 1978 and followed it with a supporting tour. Following two lengthy American tours (June to October 1978), Wetton and Jobson decided to fire Holdsworth over musical differences, and since Bruford had indicated to Wetton that he would favour Holdsworth’s more improvisational approach in the event of a disagreement on the direction of the band, they lined up Terry Bozzio (another one-time Frank Zappa band member) to replace Bruford. Bruford took several instrumentals with him that he had developed for the live U.K. repertoire ("Forever Until Sunday", "Sahara of Snow”), that he instead recorded with his solo band  Bruford on his second album One of a Kind (1979).

Trio line-up
U.K. attempted unsuccessfully to find another guitarist before resolving to continue as a trio. They recorded the studio album Danger Money, released in March 1979, and spent much of that year touring North America as opening act for Jethro Tull. The album spawned a minor hit single, "Nothing to Lose", which reached number 67 on the UK charts. A live album, Night After Night, was recorded in Japan that spring and released in September 1979. Following a final European tour in December 1979, and in spite of plans to record a new studio album in America in March 1980, U.K. disbanded as Jobson and Wetton had different ideas on how the band should develop. Jobson wanted UK to go on with more long instrumental pieces, while Wetton thought that performing shorter, more commercial songs was a better idea. Jobson stated that one particularly pop-oriented song contributed to the band dissolving: "When Will You Realize", a non-LP B-side featured on the "Night After Night" single, which Wetton would re-record (with slightly different lyrics) in 1980 on his solo album Caught in the Crossfire.

Aftermath
Jobson worked with Jethro Tull on the album A (1980) and went on to a solo career. Wetton, following the recording of his solo album Caught in the Crossfire (summer 1980) and a brief stint with Wishbone Ash (October–December 1980), eventually left E.G. Records to sign with Geffen Records and ex-Yes manager Brian Lane and started Asia with Steve Howe, Carl Palmer and Geoffrey Downes. Bozzio formed Missing Persons with his then-wife Dale Bozzio, guitarist Warren Cuccurullo, bassist Patrick O'Hearn and Chuck Wild on keyboards– the first four also from line-ups with Zappa. Holdsworth and Bozzio played together in HoBoLeMa almost three decades later. John Wetton and Allan Holdsworth both died in 2017.

Legacy project
From 1995 to 1998, Jobson and Wetton worked together on a proposed U.K. reunion album, also recording contributions by Bruford, Tony Levin, Steve Hackett and Francis Dunnery. When Wetton departed, "Legacy" became an Eddie Jobson solo project, with Wetton replaced on vocals by Aaron Lippert. However, Jobson eventually abandoned this project. Three tracks intended for it were included on Voices of Life, a compilation by Bulgarian Women's Choir organised by Jobson.

UKZ and reunions
In October 2007, Jobson announced a new band, UKZ, with Lippert and former King Crimson bassist/guitarist Trey Gunn among others, which released an EP called "Radiation" in March 2009. In late 2009, Jobson and Wetton both talked about a possible reunion of U.K. A reunion tour in February/March 2010 with Jobson, Wetton, Marco Minnemann on drums (from UKZ) and Greg Howe (Victor Wooten, Vitalij Kuprij, Michael Jackson) on guitar was described to promoters, but would not happen until 2011.

Wetton and Jobson performed three concerts in Poland in November 2009 as part of Jobson's Ultimate Zero (U-Z) project. The line-up also featured Minnemann, Howe, and Tony Levin (stick). They performed music from UK and King Crimson. A CD compiled from various U-Z performances from 2009, entitled Ultimate Zero Tour - Live, including multiple tracks from the Polish shows, was then released.

It was announced on 11 February 2011, and later confirmed by John Wetton on his website, that U.K. had reformed to play two shows in Japan on 15 and 16 April  2011. The line-up was Jobson and Wetton, with Minnemann and Alex Machacek performing drums and guitar respectively. US dates, including a show in San Francisco, were also announced and performed in April 2011. A DVD called "Reunion: Live in Tokyo" was culled from these shows and officially released in 2013.

Former drummer Bozzio then rejoined for an American tour in 2012. The line-up for the subsequent European tour included additional musicians Gary Husband (drums) and a returning Alex Machacek on guitar.

In 2013, U.K. did an "Azure Seas" tour with Machacek once again taking on guitar duties, and an East Coast tour with Virgil Donati performing drumming duties in place of Bozzio, who had once again departed the band. On 8 November of the same year, the band did also a special concert performance of their two studio albums in Kawasaki, in Japan. The drummer for that special concert was Marco Minnemann.

U.K. appeared in the 2014 edition of Cruise to the Edge progressive rock festival. The line-up once again included both Machacek and Donati. In 2015 the band announced their final world tour, with the band being joined by Donati and Machacek. Donati was then replaced by Dream Theater drummer Mike Mangini for the final dates in the USA and Japan.

Musical style
Throughout their brief existence, U.K.'s music was characterised by skilled musicianship, jazzy harmonies, close harmony vocals, mixed meters, electric violin solos, and unusually varied synthesiser (Yamaha CS-80) sonorities. Relative to specific styles, the band spans various genres ranging from progressive rock to jazz fusion.

Personnel

Members
 Eddie Jobson – keyboards, backing vocals, violin 
 John Wetton – bass, lead vocals 
 Allan Holdsworth – guitar 
 Bill Bruford – drums, percussion 
 Terry Bozzio – drums, percussion 

Touring Members
Tony Levin – chapman stick 
Greg Howe – guitar 
 Alex Machacek – guitar 
 Marco Minnemann – drums, percussion 
 Gary Husband – drums, percussion 
 Virgil Donati – drums, percussion 
 Mike Mangini – drums, percussion 

 Timeline
<div class="left">

Discography

Studio albums

Live albums

Singles

Videos

Box sets

Tours

References 

English progressive rock groups
English art rock groups
British supergroups
Progressive pop musicians
Musical groups disestablished in 1980
Musical groups established in 1977
E.G. Records artists
Polydor Records artists
Rock music supergroups
Virgin Records artists